Philip Bird is an English actor who has appeared in several British shows such as Peter Birch in ITV soap opera Emmerdale in 2006. He has also appeared in BBC's Doctors, ITV's Heartbeat and Coronation Street. He also appeared in ITV sitcoms Tripper's Day and Slinger's Day. In 2014, he played the role of Allen Klein in the musical Sunny Afternoon.

Filmography

Film

Television

References

External links

Living people
English male television actors
Year of birth missing (living people)